Eitrheim is a village in Ullensvang municipality in Vestland county, Norway.  The industrial village is located on a small peninsula near the southern shore of the Sørfjorden, just 3 kilometers (1.9mi) north of the town of Odda. Since 2003, it has been considered a part of urban area of Odda (town), so separate population statistics are no longer tracked.

The eastern end of the Folgefonna Tunnel lies on the western edge of Eitrheim.

References

Villages in Vestland
Ullensvang